The Continental KB-1, also known as KB-1 Military Biplane or KB-1 Continental Pusher, is an early design developed by the engineer Vincent Burnelli.

Development
The KB-1 was Burnelli's second production aircraft after his Burnelli-Carisi Biplane. Burnelli's KB-1 tandem pusher biplane was a somewhat conventional design compared to his future lifting-body designs. The aircraft, developed for a U.S. Air Service reconnaissance contact was not awarded a production contract despite successful demonstration flights by test pilot Bert Acosta over New York at temperatures as low as −11 °F.

Design
The KB-1 is a tandem seat pusher biplane with open cockpits. The tail is supported with two steel tube booms. The landing gear used a four-wheel arrangement using Ackerman wheels with "tusks" that dig into the ground for braking. The wings are set without stagger or dihedral. The fuselage is constructed of mahogany veneer.

Specifications (KB-1)

References

1910s United States aircraft